Tennō-ji may refer to: 

 Tennō-ji (Taitō) (天王寺), a temple located in Taitō, Tokyo
 Tennō-ji (Naha) (天王寺), a closed temple located in Naha, Okinawa

See also
Tennōji-ku, Osaka
Tennōji Station
Tennōji Park
Tennōji Zoo